William Duff, 1st Earl Fife (1697 – 30 September 1763), of Braco, Banff, was a Scottish landowner and politician who sat in the House of Commons from 1727 to 1734.

Early life
Duff was the eldest surviving son of William Duff, merchant, of Dipple and Braco, and his wife Jean Gordon, daughter of Sir George Gordon, Shire Commissioner in the Parliament of Scotland, of Edinglassie, Aberdeen. In 1719 he married Lady Janet Forbes, widow of Hugh Forbes, Younger of Craigievar, and second daughter of James Ogilvy, Earl of Findlater. She died in 1720 and in 1723 he married Jean Grant, second daughter of Sir James Grant, 6th Baronet, of Pluscardine. He inherited substantial estates from his father on his death in 1722.

Career

Duff was returned unopposed as Member of Parliament for Banffshire at the 1727 British general election.  He spoke and voted against the Government on the Hessians in 1730 and also voted against the Administration on the repeal of the Septennial Act in 1734. At the 1734 British general election, he stood down in favour of his brother-in-law James Abercromby. Abercrombie was a government supporter, and as a reward, Duff was created Lord Braco of Kilbryde in the Peerage of Ireland on 28 July 1735. He continued to dominate the political scene at Banffshire. In 1740, he commissioned the construction of Duff House in Banff. He was later created Earl Fife and Viscount Macduff, also in the peerage of Ireland, by letters patent dated 26 April 1759, after proving his descent from the MacDuffs, Earls of Fife.

Death and legacy

Lord Fife died on 30 September 1763, and was buried in the parish church of Grange, before being moved to the mausoleum at Duff House.

By his second wife Jean he had five sons and six daughters. The eldest, James, succeeded his father as Earl. On his death without issue in 1809, he was succeeded by his younger brother Alexander. Another son, Arthur, became a member of Parliament.

References

 Macduff baronage
Duff genealogy

|-

1696 births
1763 deaths
Peers of Ireland created by George II
Members of the Parliament of Great Britain for Scottish constituencies
Earls Fife